Kerman University of Medical Sciences also called KMU (Kerman Medical University), is a university located in Kerman, Iran. KMU is the 8th largest medical university in Iran and the largest university of medical sciences in southeast of the country with about 6000 students and 503 faculties.

More than 125 undergraduate and postgraduate program degrees are taught in 10 schools including schools of Medicine, Dentistry, Pharmacy, Nursing and Midwifery, Public Health, Paramedics and Allied Medicine, Iranian Traditional Medicine and Health Care Management and Information. Kerman University of Medical Sciences has 6 campuses including two in Zarand and Sirjan counties.

External links
Official site

Medical schools in Iran
Education in Kerman Province
Buildings and structures in Kerman Province